Senator Kay may refer to:

Ella Kay (1895–1988), Senate of Berlin
Robert E. Kay (1916–1990), New Jersey State Senate
Thomas B. Kay (1864–1931), Oregon State Senate